An incident took place on the Albania–Yugoslav border in April 1999 when the FR Yugoslav Army shelled several Albanian border towns around Krumë, Tropojë. In these villages, refugees were being housed after fleeing the war in Kosovo by crossing into Albania. On 13 April 1999, Yugoslav infantry entered Albanian territory to close off an area that was used by the KLA to stage attacks against Yugoslav targets.

Background

In early 1998, as tensions increased in Kosovo, it became increasingly difficult for the Albanian Army to monitor the country's 140-kilometre (87 mi) border with the Federal Republic of Yugoslavia and cope with the steady influx of Kosovo Albanian refugees into the country. Yugoslav army units controlled the border in a few areas, but generally relied on the remote mountainous terrain to do their work for them. Many Yugoslav border units suffered from lack of manpower, the wars in Bosnia-Herzegovina and Croatia having seriously damaged their resources. The morale of soldiers was low, with food often poor, and spare parts for army and police equipment and supplies were difficult to obtain.

Albanian authorities were concerned with attempts by Serbia to implicate Albania as a supporter of terrorism. The Albanian Army had an estimated 4,000–6,000 soldiers, and Yugoslavia was said to have "little regard" for the country's military.

The Kosovo War was a conflict between the government of the Federal Republic of Yugoslavia (FRY) and the Kosovo Liberation Army (KLA). The war caused thousands of Kosovo Albanians to join the KLA ranks. More than 500,000 ethnic Albanian refugees fled their homes in fear of Yugoslav Army reprisals between 1998 and 1999. Meanwhile, the KLA began to recruit in the refugee camps. There had been fighting along the border between the KLA and Yugoslav forces where KLA troops had infiltrated into Kosovo. The subsequent incursion by the FRY could have been in response to KLA actions in the area, according to Albanian police.

Relations between the FRY and Albania had been strained as 300,000 ethnic Albanians had fled into Albania itself. The Yugoslavs had been angered over Albania's support of NATO airstrikes and its sheltering of KLA militants. The Organization for Security and Co-operation in Europe (OSCE) had reported previous Yugoslav Army incursions into Albanian territory. The border was lightly defended by the Albanian Army which was ordered not to fire back after a Yugoslav Army attack. A KLA commander reported that rebel forces had crossed over into Kosovo near Tropojë, a KLA stronghold, in the days before the attack, this incursion was confirmed by an OSCE monitor.

Incident
From their positions on the Yugoslavian side of the border, soldiers of the Yugoslav Army fired at least 10 shells on the town of Krumë just before midnight, where refugees from Kosovo had taken shelter. Albanian Foreign Ministry spokesman Sokol Gjoka stated that the incident did not result in casualties on either side, and that three houses had been destroyed in the fighting. The same source claim the Serb troops withdrew when Albanian forces from Tropojë reached the area.

Reactions
OSCE monitors reported that Yugoslav paratroopers had crossed the border.
: Ministry of foreign affairs declared that "The infantry troops of the Serb forces have penetrated up to two kilometers (1.2 miles) inside Albania after two hours of bomb shelling on our side" On 18 April, Albania and Yugoslavia broke off all diplomatic relations.
: The Ministry of Foreign Affairs of Yugoslavia denied that Yugoslavian troops had entered Albania.
: Prime minister Bülent Ecevit stated that he would allow that "If necessary, Turkey would defend along with Albania sovereignty and independence of the befriended and brother people of Albania".

References

Sources

Conflicts in 1999
Military history of Albania
Serbian–Albanian conflict
Albania–Serbia border
Military operations of the Kosovo War
Battles involving FR Yugoslavia
April 1999 events in Europe
1999 in Albania
1999 in Kosovo
Military raids
Combat incidents